Jakobus Stenglein (born 1980) is a German slalom canoeist who competed at the international level from 1998 to 1999.

He won a gold medal in the K1 team event at the 1999 ICF Canoe Slalom World Championships in La Seu d'Urgell.

References

German male canoeists
Living people
1980 births
Medalists at the ICF Canoe Slalom World Championships